Shade Creek is a tributary of Stonycreek River in Somerset County, Pennsylvania in the United States.

Shade Creek, formed by the confluence of Dark Shade and Clear Shade creeks approximately 1.9 miles (3.1 km) downstream of the community of Cairnbrook, flows for 9.5 miles (15.3 km) to join the Stonycreek River at the community of Seanor.

Dark Shade Creek
Dark Shade Creek joins Clear Shade Creek, approximately 1.9 miles (3.1 km) downstream of the community of Cairnbrook, to form Shade Creek.

Clear Shade Creek
Clear Shade Creek originates in Gallitzin State Forest, east of Windber, before joining Dark Shade Creek, approximately 1.9 miles (3.1 km) downstream of the community of Cairnbrook, to form Shade Creek.

See also
List of rivers of Pennsylvania

References

Rivers of Pennsylvania
Rivers of Somerset County, Pennsylvania
Tributaries of the Kiskiminetas River